Kosmos 143 ( meaning Cosmos 143) or Zenit-2 No.45 was a Soviet, first generation, low resolution, optical film-return reconnaissance satellite launched in 1967.

Kosmos 143 was launched by a Vostok-2 rocket, serial number U15001-03, flying from Site 1/5 at the Baikonur Cosmodrome. The launch took place at 08:45:01 GMT on 27 February 1967, and following its arrival in orbit the spacecraft received its Kosmos designation; along with the International Designator 1967-017A and the Satellite Catalog Number 02693. A minor anomaly during launch resulted in the satellite's orbit being slightly lower than had been planned, with its orbital period being 22.8 seconds shorter than the target orbit. Despite this the satellite performed its mission successfully. The satellite also carried a science package.

After eight days in orbit, Kosmos 143 was deorbited, with its return capsule descending under parachute, landing at 05:46 GMT on 7 March 1967, and recovered by Soviet force.

References

Kosmos satellites
Spacecraft launched in 1967
Spacecraft which reentered in 1967
Zenit-2 satellites
1967 in the Soviet Union